The Addis Ababa City Hall  is a governmental department that houses the offices of the Municipality of Addis Ababa, Ethiopia.

History
Along with Africa Hall, the UNECA headquarters, the Addis Ababa city hall was one of the two projects designed to demonstrate, in the words of Emperor Haile Selassie, “that it is possible to construct grand buildings here too [in Ethiopia], by erecting a couple of high-profile structures. It is not their complexity or size that matter, but the maximum possible use of home-produced materials, in order to shake our wealthy middle class (which keeps its money under the mattress) from the inactivity that also binds it in the field of construction, and stimulate it to invest its assets also in building to make this ‘great village’ a city and a true great capital”.  Construction commenced in 1961 and was completed in 1964. Queen Elizabeth II received the freedom of the city on 4 February 1965 in a ceremony here, and attended a banquet in her honour that day.

Features
The structure is situated at the northern end of Churchill Avenue, and is a direct consequence of the avenue's re-routing, sitting on top of a hill overlooking the thoroughfare. The structure features various spaces – the hall, boardroom, reception room, cinema-theatre, restaurant, 4 bars, library, and panoramic terrace – making it a social as well as an administrative centre.

References

Buildings and structures in Addis Ababa
Government buildings completed in 1964
Modernist architecture
Seats of local government
Government buildings in Ethiopia
1964 establishments in Ethiopia
20th-century architecture in Ethiopia